The 2008–09 Combined Counties Football League season was the 31st in the history of the Combined Counties Football League, a football competition in England.

Premier Division

The Premier Division featured three new teams in a league of 22 teams after the promotion of Merstham to the Isthmian League:
 Badshot Lea, transferred from the Hellenic League
 Hartley Wintney, promoted from Division One
 Molesey, relegated from the Isthmian League

League table

Division One

Division One featured two new teams in a league of 18 teams: 
Dorking, relegated from the Premier Division
Mole Valley SCR, joined from the Middlesex County League

League table

References

 League tables

External links
 Combined Counties League Official Site

2008-09
9